Lon R. Greenberg has been CEO of UGI Corp. for 14 years, and Chairman of UGI for 13 years.

Career
Greenberg has been employed with UGI for 20 years, serving previously in the roles of Senior Vice President — Legal and Corporate Development and as Corporate and Development Counsel.
Prior to his employment with UGI, Greenberg served in the roles of President, CEO, Chairman, and Director of AmeriGas Propane, Inc. Greenberg also serves on the board of directors and the compensation committee of Aqua America, Inc.

Compensation

While CEO of UGI in 2008, Lon R. Greenberg earned a total compensation of $5,720,227, which included a base salary of $1,026,300; a cash bonus of $964,722; stock granted of $2,123,800; options granted of $1,524,000; and other compensation of $81,405. 
 Greenberg ranks 18th within the Utilities sector of Forbes' special report on CEO compensation.

References

See also
 List of chief executive officers
 Executive Officer

American chief executives of energy companies
Living people
Year of birth missing (living people)